Historically, Italy has been successful in the Olympic Games, taking part from the first Olympiad and in 47 Games out of 48, not having "officially" participated in the 1904 Summer Olympics.

Italy has taken part in all the Winter Olympic Games, winning 141 medals, and 618 medals at the Summer Olympic Games. Italy has won a total of 259 gold medals which makes them the 6th most successful country in Olympic history, after the USA, the Soviet Union, Germany, Great Britain and France. Italy has the sixth highest medal total of all time with 759. Italy has the third longest medaling streak after Sweden and Finland. Italy has medaled in 40 straight Olympic games, starting with the 1936 Summer Olympics.

The Italian National Olympic Committee was created in 1914 and recognised in 1915. As of 2020 Italy is the most successful nation at fencing in Olympic history.

Hosted Games 
Italy has hosted the Games on three occasions, with a fourth occasion is planning for the 2026 Winter Olympics.

Medal tables 

According to the official count of the International Olympic Committee, Italy has won 618 medals at Summer Olympics.

In the Summer Olympic Games, Italy has finished 2nd in 1932, 3rd in 1960, 4th in 1936, and 5th in 1924, 1928, 1948, 1952, 1956, 1964, 1980 and 1984. In the Winter Olympic Games, Italy has finished 4th in 1968 and 1994, and 6th in 1952 and 1992.

Italy ranks 1st all-time in fencing, 2nd in cycling, 3rd in luge, 4th in boxing and shooting, 5th in alpine skiing, and 6th in bobsled, cross-country skiing and short track speed skating.

Medals by Summer Games 

 Performance of cyclist Frank Bizzoni, who immigrated from Italy to the United States but still was an Italian citizen by some accounts in 1904, is currently disputed and not recognized by the International Olympic Committee.

Medals by Winter Games

Medals by summer sport

Medals by winter sport

Athletes with most appearances 

Notes: the names highlighted in pink indicate that they are female athletes.
Notes: the names in bold indicate that they are still active.

Athletes with most medals 

The Italian athlete who won the most medals in the history of the Olympic Games, is the fencer Edoardo Mangiarotti.

Men gold medalist
In this table (sorted by individual totals gold medals), the men who have won gold individual medals at the Olympics (but also at the World Championships).

Notes: in Khaki the athletes still in activity. For cycling was considered for world championships, only professional events.

Women gold medalist

In this table, the women who have won gold individual medals at the Olympics and also at the World Championships.
Updated to 16 February 2023.

Summary by sport

Aquatics

Swimming

Italy first competed in swimming at the 1900 Games, with two swimmers in three events winning no medals.

Athletics

Italy first competed in athletics in 1900. After 121 years from first participation, Marcell Jacobs became the very first Italian athlete to win a gold medal in Men's 100 metres at the Tokyo 2020 Summer Olympics on 1 August 2021, with a time of 9"80.

Cycling

Italy first competed in cycling at the 1900 Games, with Enrico Brusoni winning a gold medal in the points race that year. Italy has the second-most gold medals (behind France) and third-most total medals (behind France and Great Britain) in the sport (as of the 2016 Games).

Equestrian

Italy competed in equestrian at the first Games in which the sport was held, in Paris 1900. Six riders competed, including Italy's first female Olympian (Elvira Guerra). Gian Giorgio Trissino won a gold medal in the high jump and a silver in the long jump.

Overall, Italy has won the eighth-most gold medals and eighth-most total medals in the sport.

Fencing

Italy first competed in fencing at the second edition of the Games in 1900. Italy has won more gold medals (49) and total medals (125) in the sport than any other nation. The nation's first medals were in its first appearance, as Italy's men's master sabreurs took gold and silver in that one-time-only event in 1900. Italy won six consecutive gold medals in the men's individual épée from 1932 to 1960 (including medal sweeps in 1936 and 1956), with a 7th in 2008; no other nation has more than 5 total gold medals (France) in the event.

Gymnastics

Italy's first gymnastics appearance was when the nation sent one gymnast to the second Games in 1900; Camillo Pavanello finished 28th in the men's all-around, the only event held that Games.

Sailing

Shooting

Italy's presence at the first Olympics in 1896 consisted of a single shooter, Giuseppe Rivabella, who entered one event and whose score and rank are unknown. The sport has remained a relatively strong one for Italy, which (after the 2016 Games) ranks fourth on the list of most gold medals in shooting with 16.

See also
 List of flag bearers for Italy at the Olympics
 :Category:Olympic competitors for Italy
 Italy at the Paralympics
 Italy national athletics team
 Naturalized athletes of Italy

Notes and references

External links